Rasulpur is a village in the jalandhar  district of Punjab, India. It is located in the phillaur  tehsil.

Demographics 

According to the 2011 census of India, Rasulpur has 329 households. The effective literacy rate (i.e. the literacy rate of population excluding children aged 6 and below) is 66.22%.

References 

Villages in Zira tehsil